This is a list of notable persons (of any ethnicity or nationality) who wrote fiction, essays, or plays in the Chewa language.

Story-writers and playwrights
The following have written published stories, novels, or plays in the Chewa language:
William Chafulumira
John Gwengwe
E.J. Chadza
Steve Chimombo
Whyghtone Kamthunzi
Francis Moto
Willie Zingani
Bonwell Kadyankena Rodgers           
Barnaba Zingani
Jolly Maxwell Ntaba

Poets
Jack Mapanje
E.J. Chadza
Benedicto Wokomaatani Malunga
Innocent Masina Nkhonyo

References

Chichewa
Chichewa
Chewa language